Sonja Engelbrecht was a young teenage woman who went missing on the night of April 10–11, 1995, in Munich, Germany whose death cause may be a homicide.
Following a party the night before, Sonja was persuaded by an acquaintance to visit a bar with him on April 10, 1995.

Disappearance
Around two o'clock in the morning Sonja and her acquaintance left the apartment; Sonja wanted to call her sister to pick her up and drive her home, the friend wanted to take the streetcar home. Her companion gave her his phone card and departed for the streetcar. Sonja was left alone and was not seen or heard from after that. Afterwards, Engelbrecht's partner visited another friend in his apartment who had then told the police the he had seen her alive at night in Munich at the Stiglmaierplatz tram stop.

Discovery of remains and aftermath
On November 23, 2021, it was announced that a bone was found by forestry workers in the summer of 2020 in a forest near Kipfenberg, Germany, about 100 km north of Sonja's last known location. This was positively identified by DNA examination as Sonja's femur.  

On March 30, 2022, investigators announced that there were additional large-scale search efforts. More bones and bone fragments were found in the area of a crevice. These included a piece of lower jaw including teeth, which is being examined by DNA technology. Investigators assume that the crevice is where Sonja was deposited, which is only about 200m from the femur found in 2020. Though people have been accused of killing her it has not been ruled a murder case and the cause of death is unknown.

See also
List of solved missing person cases
List of unsolved deaths

References

External links
Sonja Engelbrecht The Doe network

1990s missing person cases
Deaths by person in Germany
Formerly missing people
Missing person cases in Germany
Unsolved deaths